Maracaí is a municipality in the state of São Paulo in Brazil. The population is 14,036 (2020 est.) in an area of 534 km2. The elevation is 435 m.

References

Municipalities in São Paulo (state)